Major General Charles Thomas Menoher (March 20, 1862 – August 11, 1930) was a U.S. Army general, first Chief of the United States Army Air Service from 1918 to 1921, and commanded the U.S. Army Hawaiian Department from 1924 to 1925.

Early life
The son of an American Civil War veteran, Menoher was born in Johnstown, Pennsylvania in 1862 and graduated 16 in a class of 77 from the United States Military Academy at West Point, New York in 1886 with a commission as an artillery officer. Several of his fellow classmates included men who would, like Menoher himself, eventually rise to general officer rank, such as John J. Pershing, William H. Hay, Walter Henry Gordon, Edward Mann Lewis, Mason Patrick, Julius Penn, Avery D. Andrews, John E. McMahon, Ernest Hinds, George B. Duncan, James McRae, Lucien Grant Berry and Jesse McI. Carter.

Military career
Menoher served in Cuba and the Philippines during the Spanish–American War. He later graduated from the Army War College and was selected for the original General Staff Corps, where he served from 1903 to 1907. He was commander of the 5th Field Artillery Regiment from 1916 to 1917.

On December 19, 1917, Major General Menoher, who had been a classmate of General John J. Pershing at West Point and was an experienced officer of the field artillery, assumed command of the 42nd Division, Rainbow Division, in France during World War I. Menoher participated in the Champagne-Marne offensive and in the successful Allied offensives of Saint Mihiel and Meuse-Argonne. Menoher was succeeded by Brigadier General Douglas MacArthur in this position.  At war's end, Menoher commanded the VI Corps (United States) and received the Army Distinguished Service Medal, along with foreign awards from France, Belgium, and Italy. The citation for his Army DSM reads:

Following World War I, Menoher became first Director and then Chief of Air Service, where he began a famous (and ultimately losing) conflict with his Assistant Chief, Brigadier General Billy Mitchell. He was promoted to major general in March 1921. Requesting an assignment with troops, Menoher then took command of the Hawaiian Division  in 1922 before taking over the entire Hawaiian Department. After this, he commanded the IX Corps Area in San Francisco until his mandatory retirement on March 20, 1926.

Personal life
He married Nannie Pearson. They had four sons: Charles, Pearson, Darrow, and William. His three youngest sons all graduated from West Point, and served in the Army during World War II. Pearson (1892–1958), a classmate of Dwight D. Eisenhower, reached the rank of major general during the Korean War.

Menoher later married Elizabeth Painter.

Death and legacy
Menoher died at the age of 68 on August 11, 1930. He was buried at Arlington National Cemetery, in Arlington, Virginia.

Menoher Boulevard, a major road in Johnstown, Pennsylvania, and Menoher Drive on Joint Base Andrews, Maryland, are named after him.

Dates of rank

Bibliography

References

External links

|-

|-

United States Army generals of World War I
United States Military Academy alumni
American military personnel of the Spanish–American War
United States Army generals
People from Johnstown, Pennsylvania
1862 births
1930 deaths
Burials at Arlington National Cemetery
Recipients of the Distinguished Service Medal (US Army)
United States Army War College alumni
Military personnel from Pennsylvania